The 1995 election of members to the Senate of the Philippines was the 25th election to the Senate of the Philippines. It was held on Monday, May 8, 1995, to elect 12 of the 24 seats in the Senate. Filipinos protected the ballot boxes with their lives and campaigned against traditional politicians who used bribery, flying voters, violence, election rigging, stealing of ballot boxes, etc. The Philippine National Police (PNP) listed five people dead and listed more than 200 hotspots before and 300 hotspots during the election.

The two largest parties, Lakas-NUCD and the Laban ng Demokratikong Pilipino (LDP), contested the senate election under the Lakas-Laban Coalition and won nine out of the 12 seats contested. The opposition-led coalition was composed of the Nationalist People's Coalition (NPC) which had an alliance with the People's Reform Party (PRP), though they contested the election separately.

This was also the first time that the electorate voted for twelve candidates under the plurality-at-large voting to the Senate; previously, the electorate voted for two candidates each per senatorial districts (1916–1934), via closed party-lists (the "block voting" system in use from 1941 to 1949), and eight senators via plurality-at-large voting with the country as one "at-large" district from 1951 to 1971. This was also the first midterm election for the 1987 constitution, and the first since 1971, as the date the elected candidates take office falls at the midway point of President Fidel V. Ramos' six-year term.

Candidates

Administration coalition

Opposition coalition

Note: Party affiliation based on Certificate of Candidacy.

Retiring and term limited incumbents
This was the first Senate election where there were term-limited incumbents.
Butz Aquino (LDP), term limited
John Henry Osmeña (NPC), term limited, ran for representative from Cebu's 3rd district and won; ran for senator in 1998 and won
Nina Rasul (Lakas)
Wigberto Tañada (Liberal), term limited, ran for representative from Quezon's 4th district and won; ran for senator in 2001 and lost

Mid-term vacancies
Teofisto Guingona Jr. (LDP), appointed Executive Secretary on July 6, 1993

Controversies

"Dagdag-Bawas" scam
As the counting of votes was ongoing on May 11, former Senator Aquilino Pimentel Jr. alleged that some senatorial candidates currently outside the unfinished tally's top twelve spots were beginning to rig votes by bribing people involved in the electoral process. Pimentel also shared that two of his fellow Lakas-Laban senatorial candidates revealed to him that a vote-buying scam called "Oplan Dagdag-Bawas" was occurring in Mindanao, where canvassers are bribed to shave off votes meant for Pimentel and transfer them to other candidates. Pimentel later admitted that he lacks evidence for his claim, while a Comelec commissioner dismissed the allegation as false. After the election, Pimentel established the Foundation for Clean Elections, Inc. in Mandaluyong, Metro Manila to help prevent fraud in the country's elections.

By late 1995, the Senate Electoral Tribunal ordered to deduct more than 58,000 "unlawfully credited" votes for Juan Ponce Enrile in Bataan and Isabela from his tally, alongside 10,000 votes for Gringo Honasan and 7,000 votes for Ramon Mitra.

On February 10, 2000, Antonio Llorente and Ligaya Salayon, who were respectively Pasig City prosecutor and member of the Pasig board of canvassers at the time of the election, was charged by the Supreme Court for violating election laws after they admitted their "honest mistake" of taking away votes from Pimentel and transferring them to Enrile. Llorente eventually went on indefinite leave from his position as Justice Undersecretary in September due to the Supreme Court standing by its ruling.

On September 11, 2000, Arsenia Garcia, who was chair of the Alaminos, Pangasinan municipal canvassers during the election, was convicted of electoral fraud by a Regional Trial Court in Alaminos due to her discarding more than 5,000 votes that were in favor of Pimentel, and sentenced to six years in prison.

Results
The Laban ng Demokratikong Pilipino (LDP) and the Lakas–NUCD won four each, and the Nacionalista Party, the Nationalist People's Coalition (NPC), People's Reform Party (PRP), and an independent winning one seat each.

Three incumbent LDP senators won: Gloria Macapagal Arroyo, Raul Roco, and Francisco Tatad (originally elected as an NPC member). Nikki Coseteng was the sole NPC senator to successfully defend her seat.

Neophyte senators were Lakas's Franklin Drilon, Juan Flavier, Ramon Magsaysay Jr., and Serge Osmeña, LDP's Marcelo Fernan, Miriam Defensor Santiago of the PRP, and independent Gregorio Honasan.

Returning was Juan Ponce Enrile, who last served in the Senate in 1992.

Incumbents defeated were LDP's Rodolfo Biazon and NPC's Arturo Tolentino.

Key:
 ‡ Seats up
 + Gained by a party from another party
 √ Held by the incumbent
 * Held by the same party with a new senator
^ Vacancy

Per candidate

Per coalition

Per party

See also
Commission on Elections
Politics of the Philippines
Philippine elections
10th Congress of the Philippines

References

External links
Official website of the Commission on Elections
Official website of the House of Representatives

1995
1995 elections in the Philippines